Citizens United usually refers to the 2010 U.S. Supreme Court case Citizens United v. FEC.

It may also refer to:
 Citizens United (organization), a U.S. conservative advocacy group
 Citizens United for Research in Epilepsy, a U.S. medical organization
 Citizens United for Rehabilitation of Errants, a U.S. prisoner support organization
 Citizens United to Protect the Maurice River and Its Tributaries, Inc., a U.S. watershed organization

See also 

 Americans United, U.S. political organization
 Citizens Together (Ensemble Citoyens!), French political alliance